Aahaa Enna Porutham is a 1997 Tamil-language comedy film directed by C. Ranganathan. The film stars Ramki, Goundamani and Sanghavi. It was released on 19 September 1997 to mixed reviews.

Plot

Kunju Gounder is a respected village chief, he seeks his missed son. Panju Gounder, worked as a servant in Kunju Gounder's house and married his sister. Now, Panju Gounder tries hard to be respected by the villagers.

Raja and his friend are fraud. Raja attempts to make himself out to be Kunju Gounder's son and falls in love with Kunju Gounder's daughter Sinthamani.

Cast

Ramki as Raja
Goundamani
Sanghavi as Sinthamani 
Senthil as Jack-an-Jill
Balu Anand as Kunju Gounder
Pandu as Panju Gounder
Sindhu as Subbu, Kunju Gounder's wife
Jyothi Meena
Kavitha
Shanthi Williams as Mangalam
K. S. Jayalakshmi as Jack-an-Jill's mother
Singamuthu
Omakuchi Narasimhan

Soundtrack

The film score and the soundtrack were composed by Vidyasagar. The soundtrack, released in 1997, features 5 tracks with lyrics written by P. R. C. Bhalu. Roshini made her debut as a playback singer through this film.

Reception
SKS of Indolink wrote "This film follows today's trend of "can't be bothered with the story but have a lot of laughs" movies, more in the same mould as Pudhayal and Pistha. For those who haven't seen the latter two, this is a spoof comedy, many jokes imitating familiar trademark scenes of some greatly successful movies of recent years" and called it an "OK movie to watch with friends".

References

1997 films
Indian comedy films
1990s Tamil-language films
Films scored by Vidyasagar
1997 comedy films